

U 

 
 4257 Ubasti
 
 
 
 
 
 1276 Ucclia
 
 
 
 
 
 
 
 
 
 
 
 
 
 
 
 
 
 
 
 1619 Ueta
 
 
 
 
 
 
 
 
 
 
 
 
 
 
 
 1709 Ukraina
 
 
 
 
 
 
 
 
 
 
 909 Ulla
 
 
 
 
 
 
 
 
 
 
 
 885 Ulrike
 
 
 
 714 Ulula
 
 
 5254 Ulysses
 
 
 
 
 
 
 1397 Umtata
 
 160 Una
 
 
 92 Undina
 
 
 
 
 
 
 1585 Union
 
 306 Unitas
 
 
 
 905 Universitas
 
 
 
 
 
 
 
 
 
 
 
 99906 Uofalberta
 
 
 
 
 
 
 
 
 
 
 
 30 Urania
 
 
 
 
 
 
 167 Urda
 
 
 
 
 501 Urhixidur
 
 
 
 
 
 860 Ursina
 375 Ursula
 
 
 
 
 
 
 
 
 
 
 
 
 
 
 
 634 Ute
 
 
 
 
 
 
 
 
 
 
 1282 Utopia
 1447 Utra

See also 
 List of minor planet discoverers
 List of observatory codes

References 
 

Lists of minor planets by name